The Best of Mose Allison is a compilation album by Mose Allison. It includes some of the jazz pianist and singer's best-known recordings for Atlantic Records. The album was originally released in 1970 as an LP record with 12 songs. The album was re-issued on a CD in 1988 with an additional eight songs and new sequencing.

Critical reception

An AllMusic reviewer gave it four and a half out of five stars and called it "a pretty good capsule introduction to one of American music's most idiosyncratic individualists". However, he noted "For a more comprehensive – and well-packaged – overview of most of his career, turn to the double-CD box Allison Wonderland on Rhino/Atlantic."

Track listing
All songs Written by Mose Allison except as noted.
Original LP
Side one
"Your Mind Is on Vacation" – 2:35
"Swingin' Machine" – 2:31
"Stop This World" – 3:24
"Seventh Son" (Willie Dixon) – 3:36
"New Parchman" – 3:04
"Rollin' Stone" (McKinley Morganfield) – 2:58
Side two
"I'm the Wild Man" (Stanley Willis, Don Barksdale) – 1:58
"If You're Goin' to the City" – 3:49
"I Don't Worry About a Thing" – 2:17
"Your Molecular Structure" – 2:05
"Everybody Cryin' Mercy" – 2:39
"I Love the Life I Live" (Willie Dixon) – 2:26

1988 CD re-issue
"I Don't Worry About a Thing" – 2:41
"Your Mind Is on Vacation" – 2:35
"It Didn't Turn Out That Way" – 2:41 (bonus track)
"If You're Goin' to the City" – 3:49
"Swingin' Machine" – 2:31
"I Ain't Got Nothin' But the Blues" (Duke Ellington, Don George) – 3:56 (bonus track)
"Stop This World" – 3:24
"I'm the Wild Man" (Stanley Willis, Don Barksdale) – 1:58
"New Parchman" – 3:04
"Rollin' Stone" (McKinley Morganfield) – 2:58
"Don't Forget to Smile" – 2:48 (bonus track)
"Seventh Son" (Willie Dixon) – 2:26
"I Love the Life I Live" (Willie Dixon) – 2:21
"What's With You" – 2:55 (bonus track)
"That's the Stuff You Gotta Watch" (Buddy Johnson) – 2:10 (bonus track)
"Your Molecular Structure" – 2:05
"Just Like Livin'" – 1:44 (bonus track)
"Everybody Cryin' Mercy" – 2:39
"Night Club" – 2:36 (bonus track)
"One of These Days" – 4:29 (bonus track)

Personnel
Mose Allison piano, vocals, producer (tracks 16–18)
Addison Farmer double bass (1–7)
Osie Johnson drums (1–3)
Jimmy Knepper trombone (4–7)
Jimmy Reidertenor sax (4–7)
Frankie Dunlop drums (4–7)
Ben Tuckerbass (8–11)
Ron Lundbergdrums (8–11)
Stan Gilbertbass (12–13)
Mel Leedrums (12–13)
Earl Maybass (14–15)
Paul Motiandrums (14–15)
Red Mitchellbass (16–18)
Bill Goodwindrums (16–18)
Chuck Raineybass guitar (19)
Billy Cobhamdrums (19)
Al Porcinotrumpet (20)
David Sanbornalto sax (20)
Joe Farrelltenor sax (20)
Jack Hannahbass (20)
Jerry Granellidrums (20)
Nesuhi Ertegünproducer (1–15)
Arif Mardinproducer (14–15)
Joel Dornproducer (19)
Ilhan Mimarogluproducer (20)
Tom Dowdengineer (1–7)
Phil Iehleengineer (1–3, 8–11, 14–15)
Joe Atkinsonengineer (4–7)
Wally Heiderengineer (12–13)
Dave Weichmanengineer (16–18)
Lewis Hahnengineer (19)
Carmen Rubinoengineer (20)

References

Mose Allison albums
Albums produced by Joel Dorn
Albums produced by Arif Mardin
Albums produced by Nesuhi Ertegun
1970 compilation albums
Atlantic Records compilation albums